The streaked berrypecker (Melanocharis striativentris) is a species of bird in the family Melanocharitidae.
It is found in Indonesia and Papua New Guinea.
Its natural habitats are subtropical or tropical moist lowland forest and subtropical or tropical moist montane forest.

References

streaked berrypecker
Birds of New Guinea
streaked berrypecker
Taxonomy articles created by Polbot